Udea simplicella is a moth in the family Crambidae. It was described by Jean Jacques Charles de La Harpe in 1861. It is found on Sicily, southern Italy and in North Africa (Tunisia, Morocco).

References

Moths described in 1861
simplicella